Michael Robert Auslin (born 17 March 1967) is an American writer, policy analyst, historian, and scholar of Asia.  He is currently the Payson J. Treat Distinguished Research Fellow in Contemporary Asia at the Hoover Institution, Stanford University, a Senior Fellow in the Asia and National Security Programs at the Foreign Policy Research Institute, and a senior fellow at London's Policy Exchange. He was formerly an associate professor at Yale University and a resident scholar and director of Japanese studies at the American Enterprise Institute, a conservative think tank in Washington, D.C.

Early life
Auslin grew up in suburban Chicago.  He lived and worked in Japan as an Assistant Language Teacher on the JET Programme.

Career
Auslin was an assistant professor (2000–2006) and then associate professor (2006–2007) in the Department of History at Yale University.  In addition, he was also the founding director of the Project on Japan-U.S. Relations (2004–2007) and a senior research fellow at the MacMillan Center for International and Area Studies (2006–2007) at Yale. 
    
In 2005, he was a visiting researcher at the Graduate School of Law of Kobe University and in 2009 was a visiting professor in the Faculty of Law at Tokyo University. He was elected a fellow of the Royal Historical Society in 2018, and was named a Young Global Leader by the World Economic Forum and a Marshall Memorial Fellow while a professor at Yale. In addition, he was a Fulbright Scholar and Japan Foundation Scholar while in graduate school. Auslin is the Senior Advisor for Asia at the Halifax International Security Forum. He currently serves as the Vice Chair of the Wilton Park USA Foundation.

Auslin was a regular columnist for the Wall Street Journal, writing on Asia, in addition to publishing in leading media such as The Atlantic, Foreign Affairs, Foreign Policy, National Review, and The Spectator, among others. He has been a commentator on Fox News, BBC, and for other media outlets, including The News Hour. He was a featured commentator and script consultant in the 2004 PBS series "Japan: Memoirs of a Secret Empire".

Select works
In a statistical overview derived from writings by and about Michael Auslin, OCLC/WorldCat encompasses roughly eight works in over thirty publications in one language and 100+ library holdings.

 2020 — Asia's New Geopolitics: Essays on Reshaping the Indo-Pacific Stanford: Hoover Institution Press.
 2017 — The End of the Asian Century: War, Stagnation, and the Risks to the World's Most Dynamic Region New Haven: Yale University Press.
 2011 — Pacific Cosmpolitans: A Cultural History of U.S.-Japan Relations. Cambridge: Harvard University Press.
 2007 — Japan Society: Celebrating a Century 1907-2007 (with Edwin O. Reischauer). New York: Japan Society. ; 
 2004 —   Negotiating with Imperialism: The Unequal Treaties and the Culture of Japanese Diplomacy. Cambridge: Harvard University Press. ; 

Journals
  The Japanese Discovery of America: A Brief History with Documents, The Historian, Vol. 61, 1999.

Honors
Fellow, Royal Historical Society
Young Global Leader, World Economic Forum
 Fulbright fellow
 Japan Foundation fellow
 Asia Society Asia 21 Fellow
 Marshall fellow
 Yasuhiro Nakasone Prize for Excellence, Institute for International Policy Studies, Tokyo

Notes

External links

 The Hoover Institution, Stanford University
 Wilton Park
 Cosmos Club
 The Elizabethan Club
 
 Library of Congress webcast: Highlights of Japan-US relationship with Norman Mineta, Midori Goto, Naoyuki Agawa and  Michael Auslin, 2007
 Interview with Auslin on "New Books in East Asian Studies"

American Japanologists
Yale University faculty
Jewish American social scientists
Living people
1967 births
Walsh School of Foreign Service alumni
Indiana University Bloomington alumni
University of Illinois Urbana-Champaign alumni
21st-century American historians
21st-century American male writers
Fellows of the Royal Historical Society
American male non-fiction writers
21st-century American Jews